The Indian National Congress (INC) is one of the two major parties in the political system of the Republic of India, the other being the Bharatiya Janata Party (BJP).
, the Indian National Congress (INC) is in power in 3 states of Chhattisgarh, Himachal Pradesh and Rajasthan where the party has majority support. In Tamil Nadu, Bihar & Jharkhand it shares power with alliance partners Dravida Munnetra Kazhagam, Janata Dal (United) & Jharkhand Mukti Morcha respectively. The party during the post-independence era has governed most of the States and union territories of India.

A chief minister is the head of government of each of the twenty-eight states and three union territories (UTs) (Delhi, Jammu and Kashmir and Puducherry). According to the Constitution of India, at the state-level, the governor is de jure head, but de facto executive authority rests with the chief minister. Following elections to the state legislative assembly, the governor usually invites the party (or coalition) with a majority of seats to form the government. The governor appoints the chief minister, whose council of ministers are collectively responsible to the assembly. The chief minister's term is usually for a maximum of five years with the confidence of the assembly. There are no limits to the number of terms the chief minister can serve.Deputy Chief Minister is a member of the state government and usually the second highest ranking executive officer of their state's council of ministers. While not a constitutional office, it seldom carries any specific powers. A deputy chief minister usually also holds a cabinet portfolio such as home minister or finance minister. In the parliamentary system of government, the Chief Minister is treated as the "first among equals" in the cabinet; the position of deputy chief minister is used to bring political stability and strength within a coalition government.

Five of the INC chief ministers have been women — Sucheta Kripalani for Uttar Pradesh, Nandini Satpathy for Odisha, Anwara Taimur for Assam, Rajinder Kaur Bhattal for Punjab, and Sheila Dikshit for Delhi. The longest-serving female chief minister was Sheila Dikshit, who served as the chief minister of Delhi held the office for over fifteen years. Okram Ibobi Singh who was chief minister of Manipur for 15 years and 11 days between March 2002 and March 2017 has been the longest-serving chief minister from the INC. Tarun Gogoi served as chief minister of Assam for 15 years, 6 days. A leader of the Indian National Congress party, Virbhadra Singh holds the distinction of being the longest serving Chief Minister of Himachal Pradesh, holding the office from 1983 to 1990, from 1993 to 1998, from 2003 to 2007 and finally from 2012 to 2017. Harish Rawat second tenure as the chief minister of Uttarakhand lasted for one day, which is the least tenure among chief ministers from INC. The INC has never been a part of the government in Telangana.

Andhra Pradesh

Arunachal Pradesh

Assam

Bihar

Premiers of Bihar

Chief ministers of Bihar

Chhattisgarh

Delhi

Goa

Gujarat

Haryana

Himachal Pradesh

Jammu and Kashmir

Karnataka

Kerala

Madhya Pradesh

Maharashtra

Manipur

Meghalaya

Mizoram

Nagaland

Odisha

Punjab

Puducherry

Rajasthan

Sikkim

Tamil Nadu

Tripura

Uttar Pradesh

Uttarakhand

West Bengal

See also
 List of presidents of the Indian National Congress
 List of state presidents of the Indian National Congress

Notes

References
General

Specific

External links